A review bomb is an Internet phenomenon in which a large number of people or a few people with multiple accounts post negative user reviews online in an attempt to harm the sales or popularity of a product, a service, or a business. While a large number of negative reviews may simply be the result of a large number of customers independently criticizing something for poor quality, a review bomb may also be driven by a desire to draw attention to perceived political or cultural issues, perhaps especially if the vendor seems unresponsive or inaccessible to direct feedback. Review bombing also typically takes place over a short period of time and meant to disrupt established ratings that a product already has at review sites, sometimes backed by campaigns organized through online message boards. It may be used as a mass-movement-driven coercion tactic, or may simply be a form of trolling. Review bombing is a similar practice to vote brigading.

The practice is most commonly aimed at online media review aggregators, such as Steam, Metacritic, Rotten Tomatoes, or app stores. It may be motivated by unpopular changes to an established franchise, political or cultural controversies related to the product or service, or to the actions of its developers, vendors, or owners. Some owners of aggregate systems have devised means to detect or prevent review bombing.

Origin
One of the first appearances of the term "review bomb" was in a 2008 Ars Technica article by Ben Kuchera describing the effect in regards to Spore, in which users left negative reviews on Amazon citing the game's perceived lackluster gameplay and digital rights management system. Kuchera wrote "Review-bombing Amazon is a particularly nasty way of getting the point across as well; casual gamers who aren't aware of this campaign may not bother to read the content of the reviews and only assume the game isn't very good."

Notable examples

Video games 
The increasing prevalence of review bombing was precipitated by the increase in influence of online user reviews in the main storefronts where games are sold, combined with little to no oversight of the content of these reviews. This is particularly true in the case of Steam, the predominant seller of PC games, where user reviews are often the only way for indie games to gain traction on the service. According to Steam Spy, review bombing generally has little effect on a game's sales, and may in fact even increase them due to the resulting wave of publicity. However, it may be a symptom of decreased customer goodwill, which can have a more long-lasting effect on the publisher, developers or game series being criticized. Depending on how such situations are resolved, the effects of a review bomb may be reversed by the removal of negative reviews as in the case of Titan Souls and Death Stranding.

2008–2015
Spore was review bombed on Amazon in 2008 after publisher Electronic Arts incorporated a DRM system that limited buyers' ability to install the game more than three times. This system was meant to prevent piracy, but ultimately led to a coordinated backlash with buyers feeling like they were "renting a broken game."

The website Metacritic was criticized in 2011 for poor oversight of their user reviews, leading to rampant review bombing on popular games such as Bastion and Toy Soldiers: Cold War that brought their user rating to low levels. Mass Effect 3 was also review bombed on the site in 2012.

Titan Souls was review bombed in April 2015 by supporters of YouTuber John "TotalBiscuit" Bain after the indie game's artist Andrew Gleeson mocked a statement that Bain made, saying the game was "absolutely not for [him]". Bain, in a following podcast, stated that the developer "has it out for [him]", leading several of his followers to review bomb the game, though Bain later expressed that he did not endorse that behavior.

The Elder Scrolls V: Skyrim was review bombed in 2015 by customers after the game's introduction of paid mods, leading Valve to reverse their decision and remove the paid mod functionality. Additional review bombs for Skyrim as well as fellow Bethesda Softworks game Fallout 4, occurred following the launch of Bethesda's Creation Club in September 2017, which reintroduced the potential for paid mods.

2017
Nier: Automata was review bombed in April 2017 by Chinese players demanding a translation of the game to Chinese, whom PC Gamer called "a powerful new voice".

Grand Theft Auto V was review bombed throughout June and July 2017 after publisher Take-Two Interactive issued a cease-and-desist against the widely used game modification tool OpenIV, as an attempt to stop single player and multiplayer mods for GTA V and GTA Online. The review bombing reduced GTA Vs overall Steam review rating from "positive" to "mixed".

Crusader Kings II was review bombed the same month by customers after Paradox had raised the prices in some regions.

In 2017, Valve changed policy to make unpaid games of any kind not count towards the game's review scores. The developer of Defender's Quest, Lars Doucet, stated that this policy prevented low priced games from being review bombed. Dota 2 was review bombed in August 2017 after Marc Laidlaw, a former Valve writer for the Half-Life series, posted a "fanfic" on his personal blog that several journalists deduced was the plot for Half-Life 2: Episode 3, which had been planned for release in 2007, but appeared to have become vaporware within Valve. Players were upset that the episode has not been released, and review bombed Dota 2, believing that Valve's backing of the game led them to drop work on the Half-Life series. That same month, Steam users review bombed Sonic Mania in protest of its use of Denuvo DRM, which was not disclosed by Sega on the game's store page on launch day. Sega responded by claiming the 'offline play bug' had been patched, and a Denuvo warning was added to the game's Steam page.

Firewatch was review bombed on Steam in September 2017 after its developer, Campo Santo, filed a DMCA takedown against a video PewDiePie made of their game, following an incident where PewDiePie uttered a racial slur during an unrelated livestream. Campo Santo justified the takedown by stating they did not want someone with PewDiePie's ideology supporting their games. A large number of users issued negative reviews of Firewatch, claiming that Campo Santo were "social justice warriors" or were supporting "censorship". Campo Santo employee Sean Vanaman later expressed "regret" over using the takedown notice.

In October 2017, PlayerUnknown's Battlegrounds was review bombed, primarily by Chinese players, after an advert for a VPN service was shown in game. As the internet in China is highly regulated, VPN servers have been used by some players to bypass Chinese regulations and play on servers in other regions. The promotion of such VPN products was poorly received because players believed developer Bluehole should introduce servers local to the region instead of encouraging Chinese players to pay for VPNs. The review bomb may also be tied to the fact that the product, which is not free-to-play, included advertising support, which has yet to occur for the game in any other region worldwide. Kerbal Space Program was similarly review bombed by Chinese players after the developers Squad changed a line of Chinese text on one of the game's assets inspired by a quotation from Chairman Mao Zedong. Due to variations of interpretation of the Chinese saying, this line was perceived as sexist by some players. The replacement line lacked such confusion but also distorted the original meaning, leading those upset with the change to respond with negative reviews.

Star Wars: Battlefront II was review-bombed on Metacritic upon its launch in November 2017 in response to the design of the game's microtransactions and loot boxes. Many saw the game as being pay-to-win during its pre-release beta trials as the unlocking of new content and characters significantly favoured those who paid for them with real money. In response to the backlash, Electronic Arts altered the progression and economic system to make it fairer to players, and the day before release, disabled the microtransactions entirely, stating that they would be re-introduced at a later date. In March 2018, developer DICE announced an overhaul for the system, stating that all content would be purely cosmetic, will not affect gameplay, and would only be purchasable through in-game currency. The changes were released across March and April 2018.

2018
The Creative Assembly's Total War: Rome II, initially released in 2013, had been patched in early 2018 to include the potential for women generals to emerge from the game's mechanics. When an image of the game showing one player's armies all led by female generals, users on Steam complained about the historical accuracy. A female community content manager stated the Creative Assembly's stance, that the game was meant to be "historically authentic, not historically accurate", but a portion of these users began to review bomb the title on Steam, believing that the content manager was pushing a personal agenda. Player-created mods that allowed players to control the probability of women generals appearing became popular on Steam.

The launch of the Epic Games Store—a competing storefront to Steam—in December 2018, has been the focal point of a number of review bombs, as Epic has secured time-limited exclusive sales for new games in series that have traditionally been on Steam, with those leaving reviews on the older games on Steam upset at this exclusivity. This includes Metro Exodus, the third game in the Metro series, and Borderlands 3 from the Borderlands series. As the Epic Games Store interface has purposely omitted user reviews, these users have turned to the review pages on Steam for related products (such as Borderlands 2) to review bomb the game.

2019
Devotion by Taiwanese studio Red Candle Games was review bombed by Chinese players after they discovered an in-game poster that referenced the meme of Chinese Communist Party general secretary Xi Jinping censoring the character Winnie the Pooh. While Red Candle stated the poster was not meant to be in the final game and took it out on the next immediate patch, the game still received negative user reviews, forcing Red Candle to terminate their publishing deals and pull the game from distribution.

Nintendo's Fire Emblem: Three Houses and Astral Chain were both review bombed on Metacritic shortly after their launches in July and August respectively for being exclusive to the Nintendo Switch, presumably by users of other platforms who were not aware that the critically acclaimed titles were owned by Nintendo. These reviews were removed by Metacritic in early September, restoring the games' user scores to their original "generally favorable" and "universal acclaim" scores of 8.7 and 9.0 respectively.

Gears 5 was review bombed on Steam primarily by players from China after the game was pulled from sale in that region by its developer, The Coalition. While the reason for the game's removal was not officially stated, it may have been pulled by order of the Chinese government due to the inclusion of LGBT+ Pride flags that players can use as decals.

Call of Duty: Modern Warfare was review bombed on Metacritic in October 2019 by users who were angered at the game's depiction of the Russian military. In particular, the campaign's portrayal of an area attacked by Russian forces dubbed "the highway of death" drew outrage from its apparent similarities to the real-life Highway of Death that suffered devastation as a result of an attack led by American forces during the Gulf War.

Death Stranding was review bombed on Metacritic upon its launch in November 2019, receiving over 15,000 user reviews half a month after release and bringing the overall user score to around 5.5/10. Publications noted that the user score bombings were both positive and negative, although found there were more of the latter. The review bombing was deduced to have stemmed from players who were disappointed with the game, which had been widely anticipated but released to "divisive" reviews by critics, as well as PlayStation users who were upset that the game would be ported to personal computer a year later in 2020. In early December 2019, Metacritic removed over 6000 user reviews categorized as negative, increasing the user score to a higher rating of 7.4/10.

Pokémon Sword and Shield was review bombed on Metacritic upon release in November 2019, following complaints from fans about the exclusion of Pokémon from previous games in the series, as well as quality concerns brought about by apparent evidence that Game Freak had lied about some aspects of the game's development. The bombing brought the user scores for Sword and Shield down to 4.6 and 4.4 respectively.

2020
Warcraft III: Reforged, a remaster of 2002's Warcraft III: Reign of Chaos, was review bombed on Metacritic upon release in January 2020, reaching a low score of 0.5/10 several days later based on over 14,000 reviews, making it the lowest-ranked game on the site by user score. The game itself received mixed reviews from critics with an aggregate score of 60 out of 100, as of February 2020. These reviews cited the poor quality of the remaster, lacking some of the features that Blizzard had previously said would be in the game such as improved cutscenes and user interface, and that it felt like a half-finished product. However, the review bomb was focused on additional issues beyond the game's quality. The game was released as a mandatory update to the original Warcraft III: Reign of Chaos due to it using Reforgeds client, which prevented players from reverting to play the original Warcraft III, even if they had not purchased the remastered version. Additionally, those players criticized the terms of use policy that gave Blizzard ownership over all user-authored works made in the remaster.

Animal Crossing: New Horizons was review bombed on Metacritic upon release in March 2020, with its lowest score reaching 5.0. Users were largely frustrated by the limitations of the game's local co-op and multiplayer progression.

Doom Eternal had shipped for personal computer versions without a digital rights management (DRM) package, though this appeared to be an oversight based on how it was packaged and reported in packaging materials; a secondary Denuvo Anti-Cheat solution was added in by a patch in May 2020. This led to a review bomb from users, due to the requirement of Ring 0 (also known as kernel mode) access to the computer system and the potential for security vulnerabilities.

The Last of Us Part II was review-bombed on Metacritic upon release in June 2020, with a score of 3.5, based on almost 30,000 reviews within two days. Publications attributed the negative reactions to initially stemming from plot leaks in April 2020, which had ignited backlash from fans of the original game. Negativity was specified towards the story and characters, additionally citing the inclusion of "social justice warrior" content, and monotonous gameplay. Online harassment and death threats were also directed at certain members of the game's cast and development team.

Monster Hunter World (released in 2018) was review-bombed by Chinese users after the 2020 film Monster Hunter opened in the region but had been quickly pulled after lines of dialog in the film were seen as a reference to a racist playground chant against Asians. While developer Capcom had provided input for the film, they stated they were unaware of the dialog as it was made by a different company.

Madden NFL 21, a 2020 American football video game, was review bombed on Metacritic. Players have criticized EA Sports, the series' publisher, for making minimal updates to the game. Madden 21 holds the lowest user rating on Metacritic.

Sonic The Hedgehog, a 2020 comedy film based on the video game of the same name got review bombed on IMDb by an Azerbaijani complaining about Azerbaijan being misnamed and being compared to Afghanistan.

2021
Superhot Team, the developers of Superhot VR (released in 2019), had previously included a toggle in the game that would skip certain in-game scenes that depicted self-harm (such as shooting oneself in the head or jumping off a tall building). In July 2021, the developers opted to patch the game to completely remove these scenes, stating that "Considering [the] sensitive time we’re living in, we can do better than that. You deserve better." and that these scenes had "no place" in the game. Shortly after releasing the patch, the game was review bombed on Steam, with negative user reviews claiming that Superhot Team was capitulating to "snowflakes".

Life Is Strange: True Colors was review bombed by Chinese players upon release for the inclusion of the flag of Tibet (seen outside of a Tibetian shop in-game), related to the conflict of Tibet's sovereignty from China.

The addition of the 2016 Hitman to GOG.com, which normally offers DRM-free games, was reviewed bombed on GOG.com due to various activities within the single-player game requiring an online connection to be able to complete.

Genshin Impact was review bombed on the Google Play Store as a result of some players being dissatisfied with the extent of the game's free premium content for its one-year anniversary. Negative reviews targeting Genshin Impact were also posted in review sections for other unrelated mobile games.

Grand Theft Auto: The Trilogy – The Definitive Edition, a remastered compilation of three games from the Grand Theft Auto series, was review bombed on Metacritic, due to players being displeased with numerous graphical and technical issues with the game. In addition, the personal computer version had been pulled from sale a day after its November 11, 2021, launch and made unplayable due to the removal from the Rockstar game launcher, resulting in some players demanding refunds. Rockstar stated that the game was pulled to "remove files unintentionally included" in the distribution, and restored it for sale by November 14, 2021, stating "We sincerely apologize for the inconvenience, and are working to improve and update overall performance as we move forward."

Blue Archive was review bombed on the Google Play Store due to a scene depicting nudity being cropped in the global version of the game, despite program director Kim Yong-ha promising in an interview the team will not alter any in-game illustrations for the international release. Kim later issued an apology on Blue Archive's Twitter account saying the censorship was due to "external requests" and "because every region has different service circumstances, inevitable modification requests can occur".

2022
Tabletop Simulator was review bombed in January 2022 after it was discovered that the automatic moderation of the game's global chat, aimed to prevent homophobic and transphobic insults, also triggered on positive statements related to LGBT, specifically blocking a user that admitted their sexuality. The game's developers Berserk Games disabled the global chat and said they would assess the moderation system before bringing the chat back.

Gran Turismo 7 was review bombed on Metacritic in March 2022, following updates made to the game; it received the lowest Metacritic user-score for a game published by Sony. Users expressed criticism towards its focus on microtransactions, including the real-world cost of certain items, and grinding. Further negative reactions targeted reductions to the amount of in-game rewards, as well as an outage that lasted 30 hours which barred the use of most of the game's modes. The same month, developer Polyphony announced they would implement future updates to make progression fairer, and compensated players with free in-game currency.

VRChat was review bombed on Steam in July 2022 following an update that implemented Easy Anti-Cheat to counter "malicious" mods from players. Despite modding of the game being technically disallowed, players criticized the decision as mods have been used to improve the game's accessibility, user safety, and performance.

Sonic Frontiers was reviewed bombed on Metacritic shortly after its release in November 2022, when YouTuber videogamedunkey published a negative review of the game. In response, dunkey claimed that the negative reviews were left by Sonic fans in order to "make my fans look bad". Some positive reviews, which expressed disagreement with dunkey's video, were also added.

Films, television and videos 
Theatrical films have also been subject to review bombing, typically due to perceived social issues related to the cast and crew and not due to any aspect of the film itself. This extends not only to user review scores on sites like Rotten Tomatoes but to the film's promotional trailers on YouTube.

The 2014 Indian film Gunday suffered from review bombing by Bangladeshis on Internet Movie Database due to a historical inaccuracy regarding the creation of Bangladesh in the film's opening narration. At the time of release, it was the lowest-rated film on the site, with a 1.4/10 rating based on more than 44,000 votes, out of which 91% gave one star.

The 2014 movie Saving Christmas was subject to review bombing after producer and star Kirk Cameron responded to the negative reviews by posting on his Facebook page. He wrote, "Help me storm the gates of Rotten Tomatoes. All of you who love Saving Christmas – go rate it at Rotten Tomatoes right now and send the message to all the critics that WE decide what movies we want our families to see." The attempt resulted in a severe backlash in which Internet users traveled to the Rotten Tomatoes page and condemned the film. Three weeks after the film's release, the film gained additional notoriety when it became the lowest-rated film on IMDb's bottom 100 list. Cameron later responded to the low rating, saying that it was due to a campaign on Reddit by "haters and atheists" to purposely lower the film's ratings.

The 2016 Ghostbusters film was met with user backlash on its announcement of having an all-female starring cast (unlike previous films that had an all-male starring cast). The 2019 Marvel Studios film Captain Marvel also faced drastically lower review scores at release (with over 50,000 mostly negative reviews within several hours of release), as offense was taken to leading actress Brie Larson's perceived activism.

The 2016 historical drama The Promise, about the Armenian genocide, was review bombed on the Internet Movie Database prior to release. Commentators assessed that these were mostly votes by people who could not possibly have seen the film, and that the one-star voting was part of an orchestrated campaign by Armenian Genocide deniers to downrate, which had then initiated an Armenian response to rate the film highly.

The second installment in the Star Wars sequel trilogy, The Last Jedi, was met with many negative audience reviews on Rotten Tomatoes, in contrast to sites like CinemaScore which polled audiences in person who gave a positive "A" grade. Publications had suspicions about the authenticity of the audience scores; Polygon wrote how it was difficult to discern how many were genuine reviews and how many were bots or organized attacks, finding that many criticized the film's inclusion of "SJW" concepts or for its racial diversity and female figures.

Some television series have also been targeted. Batwoman was review bombed for portraying the title character as a lesbian. HBO's Watchmen, based on the graphic novel of the same name, was review bombed by fans of the comic that felt the series disrespected the character of Rorschach, who they felt was meant to be the hero instead of a right-wing figure as illustrated by the original graphic novel and throughout the series, although The Mary Sue noted that the graphic novel had portrayed his character as such.

YouTube's voting system has also been used for review bombing, where dissatisfaction over a creator or a video's content may attract campaigns to "dislike" a video en masse, with a goal to be among the most-disliked videos on the service. In December 2018, YouTube Rewind 2018 overtook Justin Bieber's "Baby" music video as the most disliked video; it was universally panned and faced criticism for its exclusion of various top personalities on the service, as well as other factors relating to controversies affecting video authors and criticism of YouTube itself.

The 2021 film Music, directed by musician Sia, was review bombed following controversy around the casting of neurotypical actress Maddie Ziegler as an autistic girl, as well as for scenes involving potentially dangerous restraints.

When it debuted in early September 2022, the television series The Lord of the Rings: The Rings of Power was review bombed on Amazon Prime and Rotten Tomatoes in response to its diverse cast.

The Last of Us, the television adaption of the video game of the same name, was review bombed after the airing of the third episode, "Long, Long Time" which centered on a gay relationship between two characters.

Apps 
On April 8, 2020, the Google Classroom app was review bombed in the Google Play Store and the App Store because students did not want to work during the COVID-19 pandemic. A common claim was that if the app had enough low-rating reviews, it would be taken down.

In May 2020, the TikTok app at Google Play Store in India was review bombed by fans of a YouTube content creator CarryMinati who had criticised a TikTok user, making the app's rating of 4.5 stars decrease to 1.2 stars between May 16 and May 21. A number of right-wing activists also took the opportunity to participate in the review bombing. A large number of one-star reviews were posted, many of them by accounts which were later determined to be fake. A few days after the incident, Google Play Store removed over five million of the 1-star reviews, categorising them as "spam abuse".

On July 9, 2020, the app for Donald J. Trump for the App Store was review bombed due to Trump's threat to ban TikTok.

On January 28, 2021, American investment and trading app Robinhood was review bombed on Google Play Store following the company's restriction of buying certain stocks. The app's rating went down from 4-stars to 1-star after it received over 100,000 negative reviews. The trading restriction followed an effort by the users of the subreddit r/wallstreetbets to drive up the price of those stocks during the GameStop Short Squeeze.

On February 9, 2021, ZXing Barcode Scanner was review bombed on Google Play, who mistook it for another forked barcode scanner app which added malware in a recent update that had been discovered by MalwareBytes. The review bombing occurred after Google removed the infected app from the Play Store. The original ZXing app had not been updated since February 2019.

Businesses 
Websites offering user reviews of businesses and other establishments, such as TripAdvisor and Yelp, can also be subject to review bombing in relation to controversies surrounding their proprietors. A notable example included an Elizabeth, New Jersey restaurant owned by the family of the 2016 New York and New Jersey bombings suspect (with many reviews jokingly referring to its chicken as being "the bomb"). Yelp intervened by removing reviews not based on first-hand experience with the restaurant.

During the COVID-19 pandemic, some restaurants have faced review bombs from the anti-vaccination community for requiring partial or full vaccination.

Effects 
In some cases, storefronts and aggregates have intervened to stop review bombs and delete the negative reviews. In February 2019, Rotten Tomatoes announced that it would no longer accept user reviews for a film until after its official release.

Valve added review histograms to Steam user review scores to show how these change over time; according to Valve's Alden Kroll, this can help a potential purchaser of a game recognize a short term review bomb that is not indicative of the game itself, compared to a game that has a long tail of bad reviews. Kroll said they did not want to silence the ability of users to leave reviews but recognized they needed to highlight phenomena like review bombs to aid customers. In March 2019, Valve stated that it would employ a new system to detect spikes of negative "off-topic" reviews on games: if it is determined that they were the result of a review bomb campaign, the time period will be flagged, and all reviews made during that period (whether negative or positive) will be excluded from the user rating displayed for a game. This system was first publicly triggered upon the Borderlands 3 review bombing in April 2019. Similarly, Valve stepped in to stop negative reviews of Rocket League, following the May 2019 announcement that its developer Psyonix had been acquired by Epic Games (leading to uncertainty over whether it would eventually become exclusive to the Epic Games Store). Valve said that they had to intervene 44 times in 2019 to stop review bombing on Steam.

In 2018, Rotten Tomatoes attempted to broaden and diversify its list of approved critics, who were largely white and male, in an attempt to improve its rating experience. By March 2019, the site no longer accepted audience reviews of a film until after its premiere, as part of an effort to counter pre-release review bombing. Further, it would only accept reviews from persons that have been confirmed to have seen the movie, as verified through theater chains like Regal Cinemas, Cinemark, and AMC Theatres, or through online ticket sales though Fandango.

In February 2020, Kunai by TurtleBlaze was review bombed on Metacritic, decreasing its user rating from 8.1 to 1.7 within a day. The studio, having no idea what they had done to trigger this, found that the review bomb was initiated by a single user, using numerous freshly created email addresses to register accounts at Metacritic as to bring down the user rating, all to demonstrate that a single person could have this effect. As Metacritic had no policy to handle or identify review bombing, this scoring impacted the game. Following the review bombing of The Last of Us II in July 2020, Metacritic added a 36-hour delay for user reviews to be added for a newly released game, with users given the message "Please spend some time playing the game" during this period. This was intended to prevent users from adding reviews without having completed a game and minimize the number of reviews that may be added as a result of a review bomb.

Reverse review bomb 
Infrequently, a review bomb may be used to praise the game, developers or publishers for other actions that players see as beneficial. One such case was for Assassin's Creed Unity, in the week following the Notre-Dame de Paris fire in April 2019. Ubisoft had made Unity free via its storefront UPlay, as the game included a recreation of the Notre Dame Cathedral. Steam users left numerous positive reviews for the game in the days that followed, with many thanking the developers for the free game and others expressing appreciation for the cathedral's recreation. Unity, which was released in 2014, had received mixed reviews prior to this event due to bugs and technical problems with the game's launch. While such an event had triggered Valve's safeguards against review bombs, they opted to not enforce it since the effect was meant to be positive.

A reverse review bomb may also be initiated by users to try to counter generally negative reviews from critics. Balan Wonderworld was panned upon its launch with a sub-50% Metacritic aggregate score as well as negative user reviews early after its release, but after a few days, a suspect reverse review bomb began with users submitting perfect reviews with similar commentary to reverse the user trend's scores towards a more positive value. 

Like negative forms of review bombs, positive review bombs have also occurred as form of protest, such as in the case of anime series Interspecies Reviewers, where it was subject of a positive review bomb campaign targeting the series' MyAnimeList page. The campaign was initiated by anime YouTuber Nux Taku in response to Funimation removing the series from its online streaming platform.

The effects of a review bomb may also backfire on its intended purpose, as the added attention may lead to positive actions by other users to counter it. For example, AI: The Somnium Files had been reviewed bombed at Metacritic in February 2020, but it was later revealed this was through the actions of one person who purportedly wanted to show the flaws in Metacritic that allowed them to single-handedly affect the rating, though this same person later revealed they performed this review bomb as they were upset at how a character in the game was handled. Before the cause of the review bomb was known, the game directors reached out to fans on social media asking for help, who collectively provided numerous positive reviews. When the person's actions had been discovered by Metacritic, the negative reviews they had left were removed from the site, and as a result of all the additional positive reviews, left the game temporarily as the top-rated Nintendo Switch title while further drawing attention to the game as a result of the failed review bomb attempt. Fallout 76 had been originally released to negative reviews by both critics and players on its initial release, but its developers Bethesda Softworks put effort into improving the game over the following year. By the time the game released to Steam in April 2020, many considered the game to have been reinvented for the better in a manner similar to Final Fantasy XIV: A Realm Reborn and No Man's Sky. However, players still upset over several faults with the game's launch attempted to review bomb the game on Steam at this point. The game's community worked to counter this review bomb by posting positive experiences and reviews of the game at Steam and at other community sites to prove the game had been much improved upon the initial release.

References

Further reading

 

Mass media and entertainment controversies
Media bias
Media manipulation
Social commentary
Social influence
Video game controversies
Video game culture
Internet trolling
Internet-based and online protests
2010s neologisms